Donald Gordon Boal (September 20, 1907 – July 31, 1953) was a Canadian rower who competed in the 1932 Summer Olympics.

He was born in Toronto and died in a car accident in Ottawa.

In 1932 he was a crew member of the Canadian boat which won the bronze medal in the Olympic eights event.

At the 1930 Empire Games he won the bronze medal with the Canadian boat in the eights competition.

External links
sports-reference.com

1907 births
1953 deaths
Canadian male rowers
Olympic rowers of Canada
Rowers at the 1932 Summer Olympics
Olympic bronze medalists for Canada
Rowers at the 1930 British Empire Games
Commonwealth Games bronze medallists for Canada
Road incident deaths in Canada
Accidental deaths in Ontario
Medalists at the 1932 Summer Olympics
Rowers from Toronto
Commonwealth Games medallists in rowing
20th-century Canadian people
Medallists at the 1930 British Empire Games